Deuteronilus Mensae is a region on Mars 937 km across and centered at . It covers 344°–325° West and 40°–48° North. Deuteronilus region lies just to the north of Arabia Terra and is included in the Ismenius Lacus quadrangle. It is along the dichotomy boundary, that is between the old, heavily cratered southern highlands and the low plains of the northern hemisphere. The region contains flat-topped knobby terrain that may have been formed by glaciers at some time in the past.  Deuteronilus Mensae is to the immediate west of Protonilus Mensae and Ismeniae Fossae. Glaciers persist in the region in modern times, with at least one glacier estimated to have formed as recently as 100,000 to 10,000 years ago. Recent evidence from the radar on the Mars Reconnaissance Orbiter has shown that parts of Deuteronilus Mensae do indeed contain ice.

Source of ice

It is now widely believed that ice accumulated in many areas of Mars, including Deuteronilus Mensae, when the planet's orbital tilt was very different from now (the axis of Mars has considerable "wobble", meaning its angle changes over time). A few million years ago, the tilt of the axis of Mars was 45 degrees instead of its present 25 degrees.  Its tilt, also called obliquity, varies greatly because its two tiny moons cannot stabilize it, like our relatively large moon does the Earth.

Many features on Mars, including Deuteronilus Mensae, are believed to contain large amounts of ice.  The most popular model for the origin of the ice is climate change from large changes in the tilt of the planet's rotational axis.  At times the tilt has even been greater than 80 degrees Large changes in the tilt explains many ice-rich features on Mars.

Studies have shown that when the tilt of Mars reaches 45 degrees from its current 25 degrees, ice is no longer stable at the poles. Furthermore, at this high tilt, stores of solid carbon dioxide (dry ice) sublimate, thereby increasing the atmospheric pressure.  This increased pressure allows more dust to be held in the atmosphere.  Moisture in the atmosphere will fall as snow or as ice frozen onto dust grains.  Calculations suggest this material will concentrate in the mid-latitudes. General circulation models of the Martian atmosphere predict accumulations of ice-rich dust in the same areas where ice-rich features are found.  
When the tilt begins to return to lower values, the ice sublimates (turns directly to a gas) and leaves behind a lag of dust. The lag deposit caps the underlying material so with each cycle of high tilt levels, some ice-rich mantle remains behind. Note, that the smooth surface mantle layer probably represents only relative recent material.

Polygonal patterned ground

Polygonal, patterned ground is quite common in some regions of Mars. It is commonly believed to be caused by the sublimation of ice from the ground.  Sublimation is the direct change of solid ice to a gas.  This is similar to what happens to dry ice on the Earth.  Places on Mars that display polygonal ground may indicate where future colonists can find water ice.  Patterned ground forms in a mantle layer, called latitude dependent mantle, that fell from the sky when the climate was different.

Upper plains unit

Remnants of a 50–100 meter thick mantling, called the upper plains unit, has been discovered in the mid-latitudes of Mars.  First investigated in the Deuteronilus Mensae region, but it occurs in other places as well.  The remnants consist of sets of dipping layers in craters and along mesas. Sets of dipping layers may be of various sizes and shapes—some look like Aztec pyramids from Central America.

This unit also degrades into brain terrain.  Brain terrain is a region of maze-like ridges 3–5 meters high.  Some ridges may consist of an ice core, so they may be sources of water for future colonists.

Some regions of the upper plains unit display large fractures and troughs with raised rims; such regions are called ribbed upper plains.  Fractures are believed to have started with small cracks from stresses.  Stress is suggested to initiate the fracture process since ribbed upper plains are common when debris aprons come together or near the edge of debris aprons—such sites would generate compressional stresses.  Cracks exposed more surfaces, and consequently more ice in the material sublimates into the planet's thin atmosphere.  Eventually, small cracks become large canyons or troughs.

Small cracks often contain small pits and chains of pits; these are thought to be from sublimation (phase transition) of ice in the ground.
Large areas of the Martian surface are loaded with ice that is protected by a meters thick layer of dust and other material.  However, if cracks appear, a fresh surface will expose ice to the thin atmosphere. In a short time, the ice will disappear into the cold, thin atmosphere in a process called sublimation (phase transition)  .  Dry ice behaves in a similar fashion on the Earth.  On Mars sublimation has been observed when the Phoenix lander uncovered chunks of ice that disappeared in a few days. In addition, HiRISE has seen fresh craters with ice at the bottom.  After a time, HiRISE saw the ice deposit disappear.

The upper plains unit is thought to have fallen from the sky.  It drapes various surfaces, as if it fell evenly.  As is the case for other mantle deposits, the upper plains unit has layers, is fine-grained, and is ice-rich.   It is widespread; it does not seem to have a point source.  The surface appearance of some regions of Mars is due to how this unit has degraded.  It is a major cause of the surface appearance of lobate debris aprons.
The layering of the upper plains mantling unit and other mantling units are believed to be caused by major changes in the planet's climate.  Models predict that the obliquity or tilt of the rotational axis has varied from its present 25 degrees to maybe over 80 degrees over geological time.  Periods of high tilt will cause the ice in the polar caps to be redistributed and change the amount of dust in the atmosphere.

Other images

See also
 Geology of Mars
 Glacier
 Glaciers on Mars
 Ismenius Lacus quadrangle
 Martian dichotomy
 Nilosyrtis Mensae
 Protonilus Mensae

References

External links
Views of Deuteronilus Mensae on Mars from Mars Express
Scarps in Deuteronilus Mensae from HiRISE
 Jeffrey Plaut – Subsurface Ice – 21st Annual International Mars Society Convention

Ismenius Lacus quadrangle
Mensae on Mars